Robert William Roger (1928-2002) was an international speedway rider from England.

Speedway career 
Roger reached the final of the Speedway World Championship in the 1957 Individual Speedway World Championship.

He rode in the top tier of British Speedway from 1951-1962, riding primarily for Swindon Robins.

World Final Appearances

Individual World Championship
 1957 -  London, Wembley Stadium - 8th - 8pts

Family
His brothers Cyril Roger and Bert Roger were both speedway riders.

References 

1928 births
2002 deaths
British speedway riders
Birmingham Brummies riders
Swindon Robins riders
New Cross Rangers riders
Exeter Falcons riders